Marco Köfler (born 14 November 1990) is an Austrian footballer who plays for Swiss Challenge League club Winterthur. He previously played in the Austrian Bundesliga for Wacker Innsbruck and in the First League for Kapfenberg.

References

Austrian footballers
Austrian Football Bundesliga players
FC Wacker Innsbruck (2002) players
Kapfenberger SV players
FC Winterthur players
SV Lafnitz players
Swiss Challenge League players
1990 births
Living people

Association football midfielders
People from Zell am See
Footballers from Salzburg (state)
Austrian expatriate sportspeople in Switzerland
Austrian expatriate footballers
Expatriate footballers in Switzerland